Nassau Boulevard (signed as Nassau Boulevard Adelphi University on station signage) is a station on the west side of Nassau Boulevard in Garden City, New York. It is one of five Long Island Rail Road stations in the village.

History 
The station was built along the line of the former Central Railroad of Long Island. The station opened in 1907. It was instead built by the former village of Garden City Estates, which was merged with Garden City in 1915. In the early 2000s, the station underwent renovations, including installation of ramps. A pedestrian tunnel exists at the station.

Station layout
The station has two slightly offset high-level side platforms, each 10 cars long. The station is near Adelphi University. There is parking at the station by local permit only. The pedestrian tunnel entrances resemble the former tunnel for nearby Stewart Manor station.

Image gallery

References

External links

Unofficial LIRR History website
1907 Nassau Boulevard Station Photo
January 2006 Nassau Boulevard Photo from Cobblestone Parking Lot
 Station House from Google Maps Street View (Exterior)
Station House from Google Maps Street View(Interior)
Platforms from Google Maps Street View

Garden City, New York
Long Island Rail Road stations in Nassau County, New York
Railway stations in the United States opened in 1907
1907 establishments in New York (state)
Railway stations in New York (state) at university and college campuses